The singles discography of American country music artist Barbara Mandrell contains 54 singles as a lead artists, seven singles as a collaborative artist, six promotional singles and one music video. In 1966, Mandrell's debut single was released titled "Queen for a Day". She then signed a recording contract and in 1969 had her first charting release with a cover of "I've Been Loving You Too Long (To Stop Now)". In the early 1970s, Mandrell had a series of top 20 charting singles on America's Billboard country songs chart. This included "Playin' Around with Love" (1970), "Treat Him Right" (1971) and "Show Me" (1972). She collaborated with David Houston on several singles as well. Their most successful was 1970's "After Closing Time", which became Mandrell's first top ten hit on the Billboard country chart. During this period she also reached the top ten with "Tonight My Baby's Coming Home" (1971) and "The Midnight Oil" (1973). In 1975, Mandrell signed to ABC Records and had a top five country hit with "Standing Room Only". 

In 1978, Mandrell began recording for the MCA label and had her most commercially-successful singles. This included her first number one single in both the United States and Canada with "Sleeping Single in a Double Bed" the same year. She followed it with a cover of "If Loving You Is Wrong (I Don't Want to Be Right)" which also topped the country charts. It also crossed over onto the Hot 100 where it reached number 31 and number six on the adult contemporary chart. She followed it with the crossover songs "Fooled by a Feeling" and "Years". The latter release also topped the Billboard and RPM country charts. In the early 1980s, Mandrell had a series of top ten country singles including "Crackers" (1980), "Wish You Were Here" (1981), "Operator, Long Distance Please" (1982) and "In Times Like These" (1983). Her singles also reached the top of the Billboard and RPM country charts including "I Was Country When Country Wasn't Cool" (1981), "'Till You're Gone" (1982) and "One of a Kind Pair of Fools" (1983). 

In 1984, Mandrell collaborated with Lee Greenwood and had several top ten country singles. Her solo recordings continued having commercial success such as "There's No Love in Tennessee" (1985) and "No One Mends a Broken Heart Like You" (1986). Mandrell switched to Capitol Records in the later part of the decade and had a top five country hit with a cover of "I Wish I Could Fall in Love Today" (1989). Her follow-up single "My Train of Thought" was her last to reach the top 20. It was followed by "Mirror, Mirror" (1989), which was her last single to chart the Billboard country survey. In the 1990s, she continued recording and releasing singles including "You've Become the Dream" and "I'll Leave Something Good Behind".

Singles

As lead artist

As a collaborative artist

As a featured artist

Promotional singles

Music videos

Notes

References 

Country music discographies
Discographies of American artists